The women's C-2 500 metres competition at the 2017 ICF Canoe Sprint World Championships in Račice took place at the Sportcentrum Račice.

Schedule
The schedule was as follows:

All times are Central European Summer Time (UTC+2)

Results

Heats
Heat winners advanced directly to the A final. The next six fastest boats in each heat advanced to the semifinals.

Heat 1

Heat 2

Heat 3

Semifinals
Qualification was as follows:

The fastest four boats in the first semi advanced to the A final as two boats were tied for third place. The fastest three boats in the second semi also advanced to the A final.
The next four fastest boats in each semi, plus the fastest remaining boat advanced to the B final.

Semifinal 1

Semifinal 2

Notes

Finals

Final B
Competitors in this final raced for positions 11 to 19.

Final A
Competitors in this final raced for positions 1 to 10, with medals going to the top three.

References

ICF
2017 ICF Canoe Sprint World Championships